Matthias Minder (born 3 February 1993) is a Swiss professional footballer who plays as a goalkeeper.

Club career
A youth product of Winterthur, Minder transferred to Neuchâtel Xamax 1 May 2018. Minder made his professional debut with Xamax in a 3–1 Swiss Cup loss to Lugano on 31 October 2018.

References

External links
 
 Xamax Profile

1993 births
People from Winterthur
Living people
Swiss men's footballers
Association football goalkeepers
Neuchâtel Xamax FCS players
FC Winterthur players
Grasshopper Club Zürich players
Swiss 1. Liga (football) players
Swiss Challenge League players
Swiss Super League players
Sportspeople from the canton of Zürich